Everybody's Doin' the Hustle & Dead on the Double Bump is the 41st studio album by American musician James Brown. The album was released in September 1975, by Polydor Records.

Track listing
All tracks composed by James Brown; except where indicated

Personnel
Bob Both - production supervision, recording and mixing engineer
David Stone, Major Little - assistant engineer
Douglas Gervasi - cover photography

References

1975 albums
James Brown albums
Albums produced by James Brown
Polydor Records albums